Cryptanthus warren-loosei is a plant species in the genus Cryptanthus. This species is endemic to Brazil.

Cultivars
 Cryptanthus 'Pickel'
 Cryptanthus 'Soerries'

References

BSI Cultivar Registry Retrieved 11 October 2009

warren-loosei
Flora of Brazil
Plants described in 1993